The 1980 Benson and Hedges Open was a men's professional tennis tournament. The event was part of the 1980 Grand Prix circuit and was held in Auckland, New Zealand. It was the 13th edition of the tournament and was played on outdoor hardcourts and was held from 1 January through 7 January 1980. First-seeded John Sadri won the singles title.

Finals

Singles

 John Sadri defeated  Tim Wilkison 6–4, 3–6, 6–3, 6–4
 It was Sadri's 1st title of the year and the 1st of his career.

Doubles
 Peter Feigl /  Rod Frawley defeated  John Sadri /  Tim Wilkison 6–2, 7–5
 It was Feigl's 1st title of the year and the 4th of his career. It was Frawley's 1st title of the year and the 2nd of his career.

References

External links
 ATP – tournament profile
 ITF – tournament edition details

Heineken Open
Heineken Open
ATP Auckland Open
January 1980 sports events in New Zealand